JVC Broadcasting (also known as JVC Media) is a privately owned company headquartered in Ronkonkoma, New York that owns five radio stations on Long Island, New York, and 12 FM stations in Florida.

The company founded in 2008 derives its initials from its founder John Caracciolo. It is not related to the Japan Victor Company, the Japanese electronics giant with which it shares its initials.

History 
The company has its roots with Caracciolo who has been with the frequency's for years and was the driving force behind classic alternative rock station WLIR 92.7 and has worked with many FM outlets on Long Island. John Caracciolo was associated with the company for 20 years most of the time as president.

In 2006, the owner of the company that Caracciolo worked for entered into an agreement with Business Talk Radio to sell the remaining station Long Island stations. When the deal fell through in 2007 Caracciolo brought in a staff of radio pros to reinvigorate the brand and start a Spanish station on the frequency of WBON.

In late 2008, Caracciolo offered to buy the stations from the previous owner who at the time wanted to exit the business. The purchase closed in October 2009. He changed WDRE to the WPTY ("party") designation.

In March 2012, the Brookhaven Town Board approved a five-year agreement with Long Island Events, the event division of JVC Broadcasting, to produce, manage and operate the Brookhaven Amphitheater, and it was subsequently announced that an agreement has been reached with All Island Media to rename the venue the Pennysaver Amphitheater at Bald Hill.

Radio stations

Current

Former

References

External links 
 JVC Broadcasting website

Companies based in Suffolk County, New York
2008 establishments in New York (state)
Radio broadcasting companies of the United States
Mass media companies established in 2008
American companies established in 2008